The Upholsterers were an American garage punk band in 2000, from Detroit, Michigan. The two-piece band was composed of Jack White and Brian Muldoon of The Muldoons.  Muldoon provided drums, while White played on guitar and created sounds with a worm gear saw. They were originally called Two Part Resin.

Beginnings
White grew up and lived in Detroit, Michigan. He originally was a drummer, but decided to take up guitar at age nine. White was in various other bands in the mid to late 1990s such as Goober & the Peas, The Go, Two-Star Tabernacle, a brief stint with The Hentchmen, and most prominently The White Stripes. White was an upholstering apprentice of Muldoon, a family friend. Muldoon was a drummer and they formed a band. The band was short-lived however, and only released one single.  It is often rumored that during Jack White's time as an Upholsterer he would occasionally place albums of his music inside the furniture that was being upholstered. In 2014, Third Man Records announced that two such copies of a second single have been found.

"Makers of High Grade Suites" 
"Makers of High Grade Suites" (SFTRI 611) was their only single, a 7" record released on the Sympathy for the Record Industry label in 2000. The track listing (with the composer) is:

 "Apple of My Eye" – Jack White
 "I Ain't Superstitious" – Willie Dixon
 "Pain (Gimme Sympathy)" – Jack Starr

The songs were recorded at Third Man Studio and produced by White and Muldoon. Those tracks were then mixed at Ghetto Recorders in Detroit. The record itself came with a variety of inserts, such as a sticker for White's business Third Man Upholstery, his own business cards, a "fabric" sample of sandpaper, a Muldoon Studio business card and a reproduction of an WE Klomp upholstery tag. The single was pressed in a limited quantity and is highly collectible, selling for around $400–900 on eBay.

After the band
White became famous with his other duo, The White Stripes, and later the groups The Raconteurs and The Dead Weather. White received multiple Grammy Awards for his music with The White Stripes, and his collaboration with Loretta Lynn.

Muldoon still resides in Detroit. He has taken photographs for The White Stripes' "The Denial Twist"  single, which portray Jack White standing over a dead raccoon and Meg White playing music for a raccoon. Muldoon's photo is on the back of the single's sleeve.
Muldoon went on to form the family band The Muldoons, with his two sons, Shane (age 9) and Hunter (age 13).

In film
The Upholsterers were discussed in the documentary film It Might Get Loud.

References

Punk rock groups from Michigan
Sympathy for the Record Industry artists
Garage punk groups
Punk blues musical groups
Musical groups from Detroit
American musical duos
2000 establishments in Michigan
Musical groups established in 2000